The Apsara Theater is Siem Reap’s oldest Theatre, opened 1997 opposite the Angkor Village Hotel, with the revival of the royal Angkorian Apsara dance, Reamker (Ramayana), and other Khmer Traditional Dances like Apsara Ballet and the stories of workers life, like the fishermen's dance. This unique dance style was once reserved only for the royal family and their honoured guests to admire.

See also
Dance in Cambodia

References

External links 
 Apsara Theater on Facebook

Buildings and structures in Siem Reap
Theatres in Cambodia
Tourist attractions in Siem Reap province
Performing arts venues in Cambodia
Music venues completed in 1997
Theatres completed in 1997